William P. Jones  (1870–1953) was a Welsh international footballer. He was part of the Wales national football team between 1889 and 1890, playing 4 matches. He played his first match on 23  February 1889 against England and his last match on 22 March 1890 against Scotland. At club level, he played for Druids.

See also 
 List of Wales international footballers (alphabetical)

References 

1870 births
1953 deaths
Welsh footballers
Wales international footballers
Druids F.C. players
Place of birth missing
Date of death missing
Association footballers not categorized by position